Vyans-le-Val is a commune in the Haute-Saône department in the region of Bourgogne-Franche-Comté in eastern France.

It is located on a tributary of the river Lizaine, five km south of Hericourt and two km west of Bussurel, close to the Haute-Saône / Doubs border.

The village church is a Lutheran Protestant church, part of the United Protestant Church of France.

Population

See also
Communes of the Haute-Saône department

References

Communes of Haute-Saône